The International Cycling Classic, also known as Superweek, was a multi-day cycling race held around Milwaukee, Wisconsin. The race took place annually from 1989 to 2011 and was contested over 17 days. Beginning in 1999, there was also a women's edition of the race.

Winners

Men

Women

References

External links 
 Archived official site

Cycle races in the United States
Recurring sporting events established in 1989
Recurring sporting events disestablished in 2011
1989 establishments in Wisconsin
2011 disestablishments in Wisconsin
Sports competitions in Wisconsin
Defunct cycling races in the United States